The  is a  long river that flows through Saitama Prefecture and Tokyo. Its average flow in 2002 was 30m³/s.

It originates on Mount Kobushi in Saitama Prefecture, and empties into Tokyo Bay.

The river is one of Tokyo's major sources of tap water, and together with the Tone River, accounts for around 80% of Tokyo's water supply as of 2018. The Okubo water purification plant takes water from the river.

History
Attempts to control flooding of the Arakawa River have been made since the area that is now Tokyo became the de facto capital of Japan during the Edo period. In 1996 an agreement was signed to make it a "sister river" of the Potomac River in the eastern United States. This means that officials and volunteers from both river areas collaborate with each other.

In popular culture
This river is also depicted in many anime such as Toaru Kagaku no Railgun and Arakawa Under the Bridge, which is set on the riverbank.

In the 2010 crime drama video game Yakuza 4, the adoptive father of the third protagonist Masayoshi Tanimura, Tokyo detective Taigi Tanimura, was shot to death by his fellow detective he was partnered with who was actually an undercover mobster, Junji Sugiuchi, who dumped his body into the Arakawa River afterwards. The reason why Detective Taigi Tanimura was murdered by the Yakuza, and had his lifeless body dumped into the Arakawa River is a critical part of the game's storyline, and a mystery that is solved by the conclusion of the game.

See also
Sumida River
Arakawa Under the Bridge, an anime set under a bridge on the river.

References

External links

Rivers of Saitama Prefecture
Rivers of Tokyo
Rivers of Japan